August Riedinger (9 October 1845 – 15 January 1919) was a German businessman who operated gas companies in Germany and Europe and also participated in balloon manufacturing.

Life 
Riedinger was born in 1845 as the son of the industrialist Ludwig August Riedinger in Augsburg. After six years of studies at the Zurich Polytechnic he entered his father's machinery and bronzeworks business in 1877.

His father died in 1879 when the business had 25 gasworks in Bavaria, and another 42 in the rest of Europe and a number of gas plants for factories and public buildings. In 1883 Riedinger took over the business and in 1887 when the company converted to the Joint stock company , he became a member of its supervisory board.

He also worked in the executive committee of the German gas industry association. (a local railway).

From 1888 Riedinger began working with August von Parseval and Rudolf Hans Bartsch von Sigsfeld on the development of dirigible airships. Due to the high development costs he auctioned off his museum collection in 1894. In 1897 he founded the 
, which until the end of World War I produced about 4,000 unmanned military kite balloons (hydrogen filled balloons shaped to act as a kite).

Later in 1931 from the same Ballonfabrik'''s launch site Auguste Piccard made the first ascent into the Stratosphere.

In 1910 Riedinger founded a company to manufacture Blau gas, a fuel gas produced from Petroleum, named after its inventor Hermann Blau. Blau gas was burned for lighting and heating; and later also used as fuel for the LZ 127 Graf Zeppelin.

He was also known for encouraging technical progress and as a patron of the arts.

August Riedinger was married twice. His first wife Anna (1848–1882) was Max von Pettenkofer's daughter. After Anna's early death he married Bertha Brandenberger in 1883, the daughter of  the technical director of the Augsburg Baumwollspinnerei am Stadtbach (a cotton spinning mill). With each wife he had one son and one daughter.

 References 

 Augsburg city archive. Stadtarchiv Augsburg - Augsburger Persönlichkeiten (German)
 Frühschütz, Oliver. L.A. Riedinger Augsburg Retrieved 2008-07-15
 Vogt, Wilhelm. :wikisource:de:ADB:Riedinger, Ludwig August. Allgemeine Deutsche Biographie. Bayrischen Akademie der Wissenschaften, Band 28 (1889), page 534
 Editors of German Wikipedia. August Riedinger Retrieved 2008-07-15
  Retrieved 2008-07-15

 Literature 
 Augsburger Stadtlexikon 1998, 753f. (German)
 Götz Frhr. von Pölnitz: Lebensbilder aus dem Bayerischen Schwaben''; Band 4 (German)

1845 births
1919 deaths
Businesspeople from Augsburg